The Para foliage-gleaner (Automolus paraensis) is a species of bird in the family Furnariidae. It is found in humid forest in the southeastern Amazon Basin in Brazil, being restricted to the regions east of the Madeira River and south of the Amazon River. Until recently, it was considered a subspecies of the olive-backed foliage-gleaner, and the morphology of the two is very similar, but their voices differ significantly.

References
 Zimmer, K. J. (2002). Species limits in Olive-backed Foliage-gleaners. Wilson Bull. 114: 20–37.

Para foliage-gleaner
Birds of the Amazon Basin
Para foliage-gleaner
Birds of Brazil